The canton of Saint-Aubin-du-Cormier is a former canton of France, located in the arrondissement of Fougères-Vitré, in the Ille-et-Vilaine département, Brittany region of France. It had 11,636 inhabitants (2012). It was disbanded following the French canton reorganisation which came into effect in March 2015. It consisted of 10 communes, which joined the canton of Fougères-1 in 2015.

Composition
The canton comprised the following communes:

La Chapelle-Saint-Aubert
Gosné
Mézières-sur-Couesnon
Saint-Aubin-du-Cormier
Saint-Christophe-de-Valains
Saint-Georges-de-Chesné
Saint-Jean-sur-Couesnon
Saint-Marc-sur-Couesnon
Saint-Ouen-des-Alleux
Vendel

References

Saint-Aubin-du-Cormier
2015 disestablishments in France
States and territories disestablished in 2015